The 1994 Australian Grand Prix (formally the LIX Adelaide Australian Grand Prix) was a Formula One motor race held on 13 November 1994 at the Adelaide Street Circuit. It was the sixteenth and final race of the 1994 Formula One World Championship. The 81-lap race was won by Nigel Mansell driving for the Williams team after starting from pole position. Gerhard Berger finished second in a Ferrari car with Martin Brundle third for the McLaren team.

The race is remembered, besides being the closing of one of the most tragic seasons in the history of the category, also for an incident involving the two title contenders Damon Hill and Michael Schumacher which forced both to retire and resulted in Schumacher winning the World Drivers' Championship. Also notable was the last appearance in a Formula One Grand Prix of the first incarnation of Team Lotus, previously seven-time Constructors' Champions. It was also the 31st and last Grand Prix victory of Nigel Mansell's Formula One career. , this was the last Formula One race where the number of entrants exceeded the number of places on the starting grid. This would also prove to be the last Grand Prix for Christian Fittipaldi, Franck Lagorce, Michele Alboreto, Hideki Noda, David Brabham, JJ Lehto, and Paul Belmondo, and the first Grand Prix for Jean-Denis Délétraz.

Report

Background
Heading into the final race of the season, Benetton driver Michael Schumacher was leading the Drivers' Championship with 92 points; Williams driver Damon Hill was second on 91 points, one point behind Schumacher. Williams led the Constructors' Championship with 108 points, while Benetton were 5 points behind with 103. Thus, both titles were still at stake, and they would be determined in the final round.

Race
Schumacher took the lead at the start, with Hill second behind him. The order between the two remained the same until lap 36. Hill was catching Schumacher when the Benetton driver went off the track at the East Terrace corner, hitting a wall with his right side wheels before pulling back onto the track. Hill had rounded the fifth corner of the track when Schumacher pulled across the track ahead of him to the left. At the next corner Hill attempted to pass Schumacher; the two collided when Schumacher turned in. Schumacher was eliminated on the spot. Hill attempted to continue the race and pitted immediately, but retired from the race with irreparable damage to the car's front left suspension wishbone. As neither driver scored, Schumacher took the title. After Schumacher and Hill retired Mansell took the lead of the race. Mansell stayed in the lead until he made his second pit stop. After Mansell pitted Berger took the lead and stayed in the lead after his second pit stop. On lap 64 Mansell overtook Berger to retake the lead of the race. Mika Häkkinen was running 5th in the closing stages behind teammate Brundle and Barrichello until his brakes failed on lap 77 sending him off into the wall backwards into retirement but was classified 12th. Mansell stayed in the lead for the rest of the race to win, with Berger finishing second and Brundle finishing third ahead of Barrichello, Panis and Jean Alesi in the other Ferrari completing the top 6.

Post-race
Schumacher was blamed for the incident by many Formula One insiders, despite having won the Championship. After investigation the race stewards judged it as a racing incident and took no action against Schumacher. Schumacher, at age 25 was Germany's first Formula 1 World Drivers' Champion, but under highly controversial circumstances. Schumacher has always maintained that the collision was a racing incident, a view that met with a large degree of media cynicism, particularly in the UK.

Although Hill deliberately avoided becoming involved in the outcry at the time, in later years he explicitly accused Schumacher of deliberately driving into him. Formula One commentator Murray Walker maintained that Schumacher did not cause the crash intentionally while his co-commentators for the race, former F1 driver Jonathan Palmer and pit reporter Barry Sheene both claimed that the crash was entirely Schumacher's fault. Patrick Head of the Williams team stated to F1 Racing magazine that in 1994 "Williams were already 100% certain that Michael was guilty of foul play", but did not protest Schumacher's title because the team was still dealing with the death of Ayrton Senna. Schumacher has been blamed by the UK public for the incident; in 2003, the BBC conducted a search for "The Most Unsporting Moment" in which the Adelaide incident was nominated. Hill's 1994 season earned him the 1994 BBC Sports Personality of the Year.

Classification

Qualifying

Race

Championship standings after the race
Bold text indicates the World Champions.

Drivers' Championship standings

Constructors' Championship standings

References

Grand Prix
Australian Grand Prix
Australian Grand Prix
Formula One controversies
Motorsport in Adelaide
Australian Grand Prix
Sports competitions in Adelaide
1990s in Adelaide